Hanri Strydom (born 7 November 1980) is a South African former cricketer who played as an all-rounder, batting right-handed and bowling right-arm medium. She appeared in eight One Day Internationals for South Africa between 2000 and 2004. She played domestic cricket for Northerns and Limpopo.

She also represented South Africa in Indoor Cricket after her international career.

References

External links
 
 

1980 births
Living people
South African women cricketers
South Africa women One Day International cricketers
Northerns women cricketers
Limpopo women cricketers